Noah Dale Bastian (born August 26, 1979) is an American actor and TV personality best known for his role as Chad Linus in the MTV movie and series, 2ge+her.

Bastian was born in San Jose, California. His TV appearances include guest roles on Maybe It's Me, Everwood and JAG. His first movie was a Disney movie, Johnny Tsunami, and his latest, Ice Spiders, premiered on the SCI FI on June 9, 2007. Noah also appeared in the independent film The Adventures of Food Boy.

Bastian participated in a documentary about his struggles with drug addiction. The documentary, directed by his brother Tyler, failed to obtain funding through its 2013 Kickstarter campaign.

He came out publicly in 2013.

Filmography

Film

Television

References

External links

1979 births
Living people
Male actors from San Jose, California
American male film actors
American male television actors
2gether (band) members